The Cardinals–Royals rivalry (also known as the Show-Me Series or I-70 Series) is a Major League Baseball (MLB) interleague rivalry between the St. Louis Cardinals of the National League (NL) Central division and the Kansas City Royals of the American League (AL) Central division. Both teams played against each other for the first time in the 1985 World Series, which the Royals won 4-3. Owing to their geographical proximity, these two teams face each other every regular season in interleague play (a setup known as a "natural rivalry").

Background
The Cardinals are one of Major League Baseball's oldest teams, having played in the National League in St. Louis since they were formed in 1882 as the Brown Stockings. The Royals joined the majors in 1969 as one of the American League's first expansion teams. Until major league baseball introduced interleague play in 1997, the only opportunity for the Cardinals and the Royals to meet was in the 1985 World Series. The two teams had gone through several periods of prolonged success (and several notable droughts) leading up to the World Series. The Cardinals fell on hard times in the 1970s after winning the 1964 and the 1967 World Series and appearing in the 1968 World Series. The Kansas City Royals had become one of the best teams in baseball by the late 1970s, reaching the American League playoffs six times from 1976 to 1984, including the 1980 World Series. After several down years, the Cardinals emerged as a pennant contender in the early 1980s, winning the 1982 World Series.

1985 World Series

The first official meeting between the Cardinals and Royals was in the 1985 World Series. This marked only the second time in baseball history that two teams from the state of Missouri met in the World Series.

The Cardinals won the National League East division by three games over the New York Mets and then defeated the Los Angeles Dodgers 4-2 in the National League Championship Series. The Royals won the American League West division by one game over the California Angels and then defeated the Toronto Blue Jays 4-3 in the American League Championship Series.

The Royals lost the first two games of the World Series at their home stadium and were on the verge of elimination, down 1-0 in the bottom of the ninth in game six, when umpire Don Denkinger made a controversial call, ruling runner Jorge Orta safe at first. Orta was later thrown out at third on a botched sacrifice attempt and did not score. The Royals would go on to win the game 2-1 in the bottom of the ninth following the put-out of Orta (the only out recorded in the inning). The Royals then went on to win game seven the following day 11-0 for their first World Series title. The Royals became the first team ever to win the World Series after dropping games 1 and 2 at home. The Royals did not return to the MLB postseason for 29 years, winning one of the American League wild cards in 2014 and advancing to the 2014 World Series. The following season, they claimed their first title since 1985 by winning the 2015 World Series.

Cardinals manager Whitey Herzog had been the Royals' manager from 1975 to 1979. He led Kansas City to the franchise's first three playoff appearances – in 1976, 1977, and 1978 – before getting fired just shortly after the Royals were eliminated from the playoffs in 1979.

Interleague play
The introduction of interleague play to major league baseball in 1997 allowed the I-70 Series to be revived in regular season games. The teams have played every year since 1997, with several changes in format – variously playing 3-game, 4-game and 6-game season series. Through the 2022 season, the Cardinals lead the regular-season interleague series, 73-47.

The first few seasons of the series were nearly even, with the Cardinals holding a slight advantage with a 14–13 record through the 2003 season.  The Royals took two out of three from the Cardinals in 2010 behind victories from starting pitchers Zack Greinke and Bruce Chen. In 2011, the Cardinals won four of the six match-ups, three of them in the eighth inning or later. The last four games in the series were one-run games. In 2012, the Cardinals again won four of the six games, on the strength of a three-game sweep in Kansas City over June 22–24. The Royals won the season series in 2014 for the first time since 2010, taking 3 out of 4. They won the first two games in St. Louis 6-0 and 8-7 respectively, and after losing Game 3 5-2 in 11 in Kansas City, won the final game 3-2 after being down 2-0 late.

Results summary 
Note: All game scores are listed with the visiting score first

See also
Governor's Cup (Missouri)

References

External links
Kansas City Royals And St Louis Cardinals Share More Than Just A State
Baseball’s New Schedule Should Be All About Rivalries 
Cardinal-Royals Preview 
A Word On The Series
"There's always a festive air when the St. Louis Cardinals come to Kauffman Stadium to renew the old Missouri rivalry with the Royals."

Bibliography

Spivak, Jeff. Crowning the Kansas City Royals: Remembering the 1985 World Series Champs. Sports Publishing LLC. .

Annual events in Major League Baseball
Interleague play
Kansas City Royals
Major League Baseball rivalries
St. Louis Cardinals
Sports in the Midwestern United States
1985 establishments in Missouri
Baseball in Missouri